"Poseidon" (German: "Poseidon") is a small piece of prose of Franz Kafka, written in 1920.

The sea god Poseidon is presented here as a disgruntled manager of the waters, which he does not really know.

History 

In the fall of 1920, Kafka broke away from his lover Milena Jesenska. It was created by a productive push a series of short prose pieces, including "The Refusal". Kafka did not publish them; therefore his friend Max Brod titled them when he published them.

Plot 

Poseidon is sitting at the desk and makes calculations on the waters he has to manage. For his work, he could rely on staff, but rather prefers to work on his own. He does not like his work but sees no alternative.

Poseidon laments that people imagine him constantly chauffeuring the waters with his trident. Instead, he sits in the depths of the oceans, doing continuous calculations and hardly ever seeing the sea. Only on his occasional trips to Jupiter, from which he often returns angrily, he sees the sea during a hasty ascent to the Olympus. He is afraid that he will have to wait until the end of the world for a quiet moment and a tour of the sea.

Form 

The short story consists of two paragraphs. The narrative perspective is not established and shifts between the paragraphs. An anonymous narrator tells the story, while an impersonal perspective by someone superior adds ironic comments.

The second paragraph is dominated by Poseidon's dissatisfaction, but again he is not the narrator.

Short stories by Franz Kafka
1920 short stories
Greek and Roman deities in fiction
Poseidon